This is the electoral history of Thom Tillis, the senior United States senator from North Carolina since 2015. Previously, he represented the 98th district in the North Carolina House of Representatives from 2007 to 2015 and served as Speaker of the North Carolina House of Representatives from 2011 to 2015. In 2020, he  won re-election to a second term in the Senate, defeating Democratic challenger Cal Cunningham, and his term will last through  January 3, 2027.

North Carolina House of Representatives

2006

2008

2010

2012

United States Senate

2014

2020

References

Tillis, Thom